Jay Berger (born November 26, 1966) is an American former professional tennis player.  He won three singles and one doubles title on the ATP Tour and reached his career-high singles ranking of World No. 7 in April 1990.

Early and personal life

Berger was born in Fort Dix, New Jersey, and is Jewish.  He and his wife Nadia resided on Key Biscayne and now reside in Jupiter, Florida, and have four children: daughter Alexandra, and sons Daniel, Jonathan, and Noah.  His son Daniel, who played golf at Florida State (where he was an All-American), is a PGA Tour pro golfer who was 2015 Rookie of the Year, and as of February 14, 2021, has four career PGA Tour wins.

Tennis career

Berger was the USTA Boys’ 18s National Champion in 1985. He also won the 1985 Florida State Junior Championship.

He reached the fourth round in the 1985 US Open.

College career

Berger was an All-American at Clemson University in 1985 and 1986, where he recorded a 91–22 singles record in two seasons.  His 80.5% career winning percentage in singles play places 3rd all-time at Clemson.

Pro tennis career

Berger turned professional in 1986.  He played on the tour from 1986 to 1991.

He won his first top-level singles title in 1986 at Buenos Aires.  In 1988, he captured both the singles and doubles titles at São Paulo.  In March he upset world # 2 Mats Wilander, 6–0, 7–5, in Orlando, Florida.  In March 1989 Berger upset world # 3 Boris Becker, 6–1, 6–1, in Indian Wells.  In May he upset world # 3 Mats Wilander, 6–3, 6–4, in Rome.  In August Berger beat world # 3 Stefan Edberg, 6–4, 6–2, at Indianapolis.

In 1989, Berger reached the quarterfinals at both the French Open and the US Open.  He also won the third tour singles title of his career that year at Charleston, South Carolina.  Berger was runner-up at the Canadian Open in 1990.

He retired from the professional tour in 1991.  Chronic knee injuries forced his retirement.

During his career, Berger won three top-level singles titles and one tour doubles title. He registered victories over Stefan Edberg, Boris Becker, Jimmy Connors, Pete Sampras, and Mats Wilander.

Davis Cup
Berger appeared in Davis Cup play in 1988 and 1990.

Halls of Fame and Awards

Berger was inducted into the Florida Hall of Fame in 1993. He was inducted into the Greater Miami-Dade Hall of Fame in 2001. He was also voted "Sportsman of the Year" by the Olympic Committee in 1985, and "Junior Player of the Year" by TENNIS Magazine in 1985. In 2014 he was inducted into the National Jewish Sports Hall of Fame.

Coaching career

Berger went on to become an assistant coach at Florida International University, where he resumed his studies and graduated magna cum laude with a bachelor's degree in Sports Management in 1994.  Berger was the Head Men’s and Women’s tennis coach at the University of Miami and coached the national team.  He was the Big East Coach of the Year in 2000 and 2001.

He coached Ryan Harrison until Jan-Michael Gambill replaced him in 2014 after which he coached former world No. 8 Jack Sock. He currently coaches the World No. 19 Reilly Opelka.

Career finals

Singles (3 wins – 4 losses)

Doubles (1 win – 1 loss)

See also
List of select Jewish tennis players

References

External links 
 
 
 

1966 births
Living people
American male tennis players
Clemson Tigers men's tennis players
FIU Panthers men's tennis coaches
Jewish American sportspeople
Jewish tennis players
Miami Hurricanes men's tennis coaches
Miami Hurricanes women's tennis coaches
People from Fort Dix
Sportspeople from Miami-Dade County, Florida
Tennis people from New Jersey
Tennis people from Florida
People from Key Biscayne, Florida
People from Jupiter, Florida
Competitors at the 1986 Goodwill Games
21st-century American Jews
American tennis coaches